1180 Rita, provisional designation , is a dark and spheroidal Hildian asteroid from the outermost regions of the asteroid belt, approximately 97 kilometers in diameter. It was discovered on 9 April 1931, by German astronomer Karl Reinmuth at the Heidelberg Observatory in southwest Germany. Any reference of its later name, Rita, is unknown.

Orbit and classification 

Rita belongs to the orbital Hilda group which is located in the outermost part of the main-belt. Asteroids in this dynamical group have semi-major axis between 3.7 and 4.2 AU and stay in a 3:2 resonance with the gas giant Jupiter. Rita, however, is a background asteroid and not a member of the (collisional) Hilda family. Hildian asteroids are thought to have originated from the Kuiper belt.

The asteroid orbits the Sun at a distance of 3.4–4.6 AU once every 7 years and 12 months (2,906 days). Its orbit has an eccentricity of 0.16 and an inclination of 7° with respect to the ecliptic.

Physical characteristics 

In the Tholen taxonomy, Rita is a dark and reddish P-type asteroid. The P-type asteroids are some of the darkest objects in the Solar System.

Rotation period 

Since 1983, several rotational lightcurves of Rita have been obtained from photometric observations. Lightcurve analysis gave a wide range of divergent rotation periods between 9 and 20.5 hours. The Light Curve Data Base adopts a period of 13.090 hours with a brightness amplitude of 0.06 magnitude. Bodies with such a low brightness variation are typically of a spherical rather than elongated shape. The lightcurve was obtained in January 2017, by American astronomer Brian Warner at the Center for Solar System Studies in California.

Diameter and albedo 

According to the surveys carried out by the Japanese Akari satellite, and NASA's Wide-field Infrared Survey Explorer with its subsequent NEOWISE mission, Rita measures 97 kilometers in diameter and its surface has an albedo between 0.041 and 0.058. The Collaborative Asteroid Lightcurve Link assumes a standard albedo for carbonaceous, outer main-belt asteroids of 0.057, and calculates a diameter of 82.72 kilometers with on an absolute magnitude of 9.14.

Naming 

Any reference of this minor planet's name to a person or occurrence is unknown.

Unknown meaning 

Among the many thousands of named minor planets, Rita is one of 120 asteroids, for which no official naming citation has been published.

Notes

References

External links 
 Asteroid Lightcurve Database (LCDB), query form (info )
 Dictionary of Minor Planet Names, Google books
 Asteroids and comets rotation curves, CdR – Observatoire de Genève, Raoul Behrend
 Discovery Circumstances: Numbered Minor Planets (1)-(5000) – Minor Planet Center
 
 

001180
Discoveries by Karl Wilhelm Reinmuth
Named minor planets
001180
19310409